Whoa, Nelly! is the debut studio album by Canadian singer-songwriter Nelly Furtado. It was released in North America on October 24, 2000, by DreamWorks Records. Recording sessions for the album took place from 1999 to 2000. It peaked at number twenty-four on the US Billboard 200 chart, and opened to critical acclaim. It produced three international singles: "I'm Like a Bird", "Turn Off the Light" and "Shit on the Radio (Remember the Days)". "Party's Just Begun (Again)" was a club-only single released exclusively in the US before the album's availability in stores, and it was included on the soundtrack of the 1999 film Brokedown Palace. When "Party's Just Begun (Again)" was released, Furtado's label was unsure about the genre in which to market her. They eventually remixed "Party's Just Begun (Again)" and included it on this album as "Party". The DreamWorks label released "Trynna Finda Way" as the fourth single in Latin America, and "Hey, Man!" as the fourth single in the UK and Germany. The album spent seventy-eight weeks on the Billboard 200. It hit double-platinum status in the US in January 2002.

After the release of the album, Furtado headlined the Burn in the Spotlight Tour and appeared on Moby's Area:One tour. According to Maclean's magazine, Whoa, Nelly! has sold 5-6 million copies Worldwide as of 2006. The album also caught the eye of record producer Timbaland, who later signed Furtado to his record label.

Composition
Whoa, Nelly combines elements of a large number of genres. Stephen Thomas Erlewine of AllMusic states that "much of the record sounds like folk-pop tinged with bossa nova" and describes the songs as "blends of pop, folk, dance, and Latin". According to Heidi Sherman from Spin "Furtado takes on mainstream urban pop, alternative folk, R&B-soul, and Brazilian samba on Whoa, Nelly!". Billboard notes that "Nelly Furtado sees no reason for separating rock guitars from pop melodies from R&B/hip hop beats from effervescent bossa nova". Other articles on Billboard describe Whoa, Nelly as a trip-pop and worldbeat/rock album.

Critical reception

Whoa, Nelly! was well received by critics for its eccentric, yet intriguing instrumentations as well as Furtado's vocals.  It currently holds a score of 79 from Metacritic. Slant magazine called it "a delightful and refreshing antidote to the army of 'pop princesses' and rap-metal bands that had taken over popular music at the turn of the millennium."  The sound of the album was strongly influenced by musicians who had traversed cultures and "the challenge of making heartfelt, emotional music that's upbeat and hopeful." Stephen Thomas Erlewine of AllMusic gave a positive review while commenting that "Furtado is a restless vocalist, skitting and scatting with abandon, spitting out rapid repetitions, bending notes, and frequently indulging in melismas." and also stating that "Whoa, Nelly! unfolds as a rewarding, promising debut." Rolling Stone gave Whoa, Nelly! a positive review calling it a "wild-ass pop go-go, filled with songs that pursue adventure yet could still make the hit parades." Q listed Whoa, Nelly! as one of the best 50 albums of 2001.

As a result of critical acclaim, the album received four nominations at the 44th Annual Grammy Awards ceremony in on 27 February 2002. The album itself received a nomination for Best Pop Vocal Album, while Furtado herself was nominated for Best New Artist as well as Song of the Year and Best Female Pop Vocal Performance for "I'm Like a Bird", in which she won the latter.

Commercial performance
Whoa, Nelly! debuted with first week sales of 4,087 in the United States. It officially made its debut on the Billboard 200 at number 190 on the week of January 13, 2001. Due to the help of radio airplay, by the end of 2000 the album was now selling up to 12,000 copies per week; By the end of 2001 it was selling up to 55,000 copies per week, It eventually reached its peak at number 24 on the chart and is currently certified double platinum by the Recording Industry Association of America (RIAA).

In Furtado's home country of Canada the album peaked at number two and is currently certified 4× platinum.

Track listing
All tracks produced by Nelly Furtado, Gerald Eaton and Brian West, except for "Well, Well", which is produced by Furtado and Jon Levine.

Samples
Hey, Man!" contains a sample from "White Man Sleeps (Second Movement)" by Kronos Quartet.
"My Love Grows Deeper" (Part 1) contains a sample from "Stride With Ease" by Jeff Tyzik.

Personnel 
Credits are adapted from AllMusic. 

Nelly Furtado – lead and background vocals, acoustic guitar, songwriting
Field – bass guitar, acoustic guitar
Track – tambourine, background vocals, quica, shakers
Curt Bisquera – drums
Lil' Jaz – turntables
Johnny "The American" – electric guitar
Bob Ludwig – mastering
Rick Waychesko – trumpet, fluglehorn
Mike Elizondo – bass guitar, double bass
Victor Rebelo – percussion, berimbau, shaker 
Camara Kambon – piano
Martin Tillmann – cello

James McCollum – guitar
Russ Miller – drums
Allan Molnar – vibraphone
Brad Haehnel – shaker
Roberto Occhipinti – bass guitar
Luis Orbegoso – congas, toms
Joe "Public" Allen – trumpet
Nuno Cristo – guitar
Alex Rebelo – rhythm guitar
Daniel Stone – udu, shaker, triangle
Martin Tillmann – cello

Charts

Weekly charts

Year-end charts

Certifications and sales

Release history

References

2000 debut albums
Nelly Furtado albums
DreamWorks Records albums
Interscope Geffen A&M Records albums
Festival Records albums
Mushroom Records albums
Warner Records albums
Albums produced by Jon Levine
Albums recorded at Metalworks Studios
Trip hop albums by Canadian artists